The following lists events in 2012 in Iraq.

Incumbents 

 President: Jalal Talabani
 Prime Minister: Nouri al-Maliki
 Vice President: Khodair al-Khozaei Tariq al-Hashimi (until September 10)

Events 

 2012–2013 Iraqi protests

January 

 January 5 – A series of explosions occur in mainly Shia Muslim neighbourhoods of Baghdad and in the city of Nasiriyah, with at least 73 killed and 149 wounded.
 January 6 – Asa'ib Ahl al-Haq, the Iranian-backed Shiite militia that carried out deadly attacks on U.S. troops agrees to lay down its arms and join the political process in Iraq.
 January 14 – A suicide bomber kills at least 53 people and injures more than 130 in Basra.
 January 15 – Insurgents trigger bombs and storm a police station in Ramadi, with six people reportedly killed and 14 injured.

February 

 February 12 – Turkish warplanes carry out strikes against PKK hideouts in northern Iraq.
 February 19 – A suicide bomber kills at least 19 officers and cadets and injures 26 outside an Iraqi police academy in northeastern Baghdad.
 February 23 – A series of attacks across Iraq leave at least 60 killed and more than 200 injured.

March 

 March 5 – Gunmen disguised as police kill 27 members of Iraq's security forces in the town of Haditha.
 March 12 – Robbers kill at least 9 people and injure 14 in a jewelry heist in East Baghdad.
 March 20 – At least 50 are killed and more than 240 injured in a wave of terror attacks across 10 cities in Iraq.
 March 21 – Iraq is terrorised by unconfirmed reports of extremists crushing the skulls of "emos" with blocks of cement.

April 

 April 3 – Qatar rejects Iraq's demand to hand over fugitive Vice President Tariq Al-Hashemi.
 April 19 – At least 33 people are killed and dozens more are injured in bombings in Baghdad, Kirkuk and Samarra in Iraq's worst violence in weeks.

May 
 May 8  – National Foundation Congress is founded.

June

July

August

September

October

November

December

Deaths 

 March 5 – Mohammad Shafar, Awakening movement leader

References 

 
Years of the 21st century in Iraq
Iraq
2010s in Iraq
Iraq